Rene Osei Kofi (born 31 December 1991) is a Ghanaian-Dutch footballer who has played as a defender for various clubs in the Netherlands, England, Spain, Cyprus and North Macedonia.

Career
As a product of the Ajax Youth Academy, he began his professional career at Almere City in the Dutch Eerste Divisie on a season-long loan for the 2010–2011 season.

On 10 November 2010, his loan spell was brought to an abrupt end following an incident in the Almere City locker room, where Osei Kofi put a gun to the head of teammate Christian Gandu. Two days later his contract with Ajax was canceled with immediate effect as a result.

Osei Kofi then went on trial in England at Birmingham City and Crystal Palace but was not offered a contract. In March 2012 he signed with the Spanish club CD Comarca de Níjar which plays in the Tercera División. In the 2012/13 season he played for Haaglandia in the Topklasse. He finished the season with FK Drita Bogovinje in North Macedonia. In June 2013 he signed for a season with Aris Limassol in Cyprus. Then he was without a club for several years.

In October 2017 he signed for English non-league side Chorley, however was released after making just a single appearance in the FA Cup.

From the 2019/20 season onward, he played for SV TEC in the Tweede Divisie.

References

External links

 voetbal international profile

1991 births
Living people
Dutch footballers
Dutch people of Ghanaian descent
AFC Ajax players
Almere City FC players
Haaglandia players
Aris Limassol FC players
Footballers from Amsterdam
Eerste Divisie players
Derde Divisie players
Cypriot First Division players
Dutch expatriate footballers
Expatriate footballers in Spain
Expatriate footballers in North Macedonia
Expatriate footballers in Cyprus
Association football defenders